Les Voix de l´Ocean Indien (commonly abbreviated as a Voice) is a television musical award show and competition. The program focuses on the musical scene of several countries located in the Indian Ocean: Seychelles, Comoros, Madagascar, Mauritius, as well as the two French overseas departments of Mayotte and Réunion. The competition is organized by the Voix de l'océan Indien Association and Organizo productions. It takes place in Saint-Denis, Réunion.

Artists are nominated by the public for a given calendar year. A selection committee then narrows down that pool of candidates to a manageable number for an election, conducted by the final board. This process is fairly transparent.

2018  edition

2017 edition 

 Best Maloya Artist: Héritaz Maloya (Réunion) 
 Best Séga Artist: Fami Mélody (Réunion) 
 Best Urban Music Artist: Kosla (Réunion) 
 Best International/Pop Artist: Kenaelle (Réunion) 
 Best Electro Artist: Do-moon (Réunion) 
 Song of the Year: Kenaelle (Réunion) 
 Best Male Voice: Hans Nayna (Mauritius) 
 Best Female Voice: Jane Constance (Mauritius) 
 Best Audiovisual Production: Sega'el Ft. Dimix Staya (Réunion) 
 Best Mauritian Artist: Alain Ramanisum (Mauritius) 
 Best Malagasy Artist: Stéphanie (Madagascar)
 Best Mahoran Artist: Rekman Seller (Mayotte) 
 Best Comorian Artist: Dadi poslim (Comoros) 
 Tribute Award: Jean Pierre Laselve (Réunion) 
 Hope Award: Kaloune (Réunion)

2016 edition

2015 edition

2013 edition

2012 edition

2011 edition

2010 edition

2009 edition

References 

Music competitions
Music festivals in Africa
African music awards